Wagenius is a surname. Notable people with the surname include:

Erika Wagenius (born 1967), Swedish singer, performer, and songwriter
Hanna Wagenius (born 1988), Swedish blogger and politician
Jean Wagenius (born 1941), American politician